Queanbeyan Blues United Rugby League Club is an Australian rugby league football club based in Queanbeyan, New South Wales formed in the late 1920s. They conduct teams for both junior and senior teams.

Notable Juniors
Johnny Hawke (1949-52 St George Dragons)
Carl Frommel (1982 Canberra Raiders)
Jon Hardy (1982-85 Canberra Raiders)
Glenn Lazarus (1989-99 Canberra Raiders, Brisbane Broncos & Melbourne Storm)
Ricky Stuart (1988-00 Canberra Raiders & Canterbury Bulldogs)
Matt Giteau (2001-22 ACT Brumbies, Western Force & RC Toulonnais)
Brent Kite (2002-15 St George Illawarra Dragons, Manly Sea Eagles & Penrith Panthers)
Trevor Thurling (2004-12 Canberra Raiders & Canterbury Bulldogs)
Terry Campese (2004-16 Canberra Raiders & Hull Kingston Rovers)
Cameron King (2010-19 St George Illawarra Dragons, North Queensland Cowboys & Parramatta Eels)

References

External links
 

Sporting clubs in Canberra
Rugby league teams in the Australian Capital Territory
Rugby league teams in New South Wales
Rugby clubs established in 1920
1920 establishments in Australia
Queanbeyan